Charles, Duke of Bourbon can refer to: 
Charles I, Duke of Bourbon      
Charles II, Duke of Bourbon   
Charles III, Duke of Bourbon